Narangi Tiniali is a locality of Guwahati, India, in the state of Assam. It is near the locality of Narengi.

See also
 Udayan Vihar
 Bhetapara

References

Neighbourhoods in Guwahati